Bruno Osimo (born 14 December 1958, Milan, Italy) is an Italian fiction writer and translation studies scholar.

A disciple of Peeter Torop's, professor of Translation Studies at the Civica Scuola Interpreti e Traduttori «Altiero Spinelli», translator from Russian and English to Italian, he has developed Charles Sanders Peirce's, Lev Vygotsky's, and Roman Jakobson's theories. He has published three novels, Dizionario affettivo della lingua ebraica, Bar Atlantic and Disperato erotico fox. He has edited the Italian edition of works by Alexander Lyudskanov, Anton Popovič, Peeter Torop, Juri Lotman, Roman Jakobson. He is the author of an online Translation course translated in 10 languages, the Logos Translation Course, published by the Logos Group
He is a member of the European Society for Translation Studies.

Translation Studies

Bruno Osimo's  approach to translation studies integrates translation activities as a mental process, not only between languages (interlingual translation) but also within the same language (intralingual translation) and between verbal and non verbal systems of signs (intersemiotic translation). Along with linguistics, Osimo stresses the importance of cultural awareness in developing quality in translation, profiling the translator as an intercultural mediator.

"Translation is the creation of a language of mediation between various cultures. The historic analysis of translation presupposes the readiness of the researcher to interpret the languages of the translators belonging to different ages, and also to interpret their ability to create new languages of mediation (Osimo 2002, Torop 2009). "  

A central concept of translation studies described by Bruno Osimo is Code-switching, key characteristic of multilingual individuals.

As a disciple of Peeter Torop, Bruno Osimo identifies translation parameters requesting a selection of appropriate translation strategies, oriented on the content of the source text (transposition), or on the code itself (recoding).

Among his published translation, he has made available in English the works of Alexander Lyudskanov, pioneer in Machine translation.

Publications
 Dictionary of Translation Studies: with terms of semiotics, textology, linguistics, stylistics, Milan, 2019, ;
 Handbook of Translation Studies: A reference volume for professional translators and M.A. students, Milan, 2019, ;
 Basic notions of translation theory: Semiotics - Linguistics - Psychology, Milan, 2019, ;
 History of Translation, Milan, 2019, ;
 Dizionario affettivo della lingua ebraica, Milan, Marcos y Marcos, 2011;
 Manuale del traduttore, Milan, Hoepli 2011;
 Propedeutica della traduzione, Milan, Hoepli, 2010;
 La traduzione saggistica dall’inglese, Milan, Hoepli, 2006;
 Traduzione a qualità, Milan, Hoepli, 2004;
 Logos Online Translation course, 2004;
 Storia della Traduzione, Milan, Hoepli, 2002;
 Traduzione e nuove tecnologie. Informatica e internet per traduttori, Milan, Hoepli, 2001.

Examples of the works in which some publications of Bruno Osimo are quoted:

Eco, Umberto (2003). Dire quasi la stessa cosa. Esperienze di traduzione. Milano: Bompiani, p. 374;
Salmon, Laura (2003). Teoria della traduzione. Storia, scienza, professione. Miano: Avallardi, p. 272;
Bertazzoli, Raffaella (2006). La traduzione: teorie e metodi. Roma: Carocci,pp. 15, 21,23-24, 26, 53, 78-79, 87,92, 94, 102 and 105;
Morini, Massimiliano  (2007). La traduzione. Teorie strumenti pratiche. Milano: Sironi, p.p. 116,121,124,131 and 142;
Cerrato, Mariatonia  (2009). Tradurre la scienza. Profili teorici e pratica. Legnano: Edicom, pp. 19–22, 28, 37 and 49.

References

Italian translators
Italian male writers
Italian semioticians
1958 births
Writers from Milan
Living people
Italian translation scholars
Translation historians